Quế Phong is a rural district of Nghệ An province in the North Central Coast region of Vietnam.

Population
In 2003, the district had a population of 60,317. The district capital is Kim Sơn.

References

Districts of Nghệ An province